Johan Anton Lindqvist (25 December 1759 - 17 September 1833)  was a Swedish stage actor and theater director.

Biography
Lindqvist was born at   Ystad, Sweden.
He was active in the theater party  of Carl Seuerling in 1788.  
He was the director of the Lindqvist theater Company in 1793-1820. 
He played an important role in Swedish theater life outside of Stockholm, being the leader of one of the largest theater companies in Sweden. 
Lindqvist and his company maintained the operations of the theatres   in Gothenburg. 
He was the director of the theatres  Comediehuset (1796-1800 and 1810–16) and  Segerlindska teatern (1816–20)  during the attempts to make them permanent theatres.
He died in Gothenburg in 1833.

References

Other sources
 Schöldström, Birger (1889). Seuerling och hans "comædietroupp" : ett blad ur svenska landsortsteaterns historia. Stockholm. Libris 281714
 Wilhelm Berg: Anteckningar om Göteborgs äldre teatrar / Band 1. 1690-1794 (1896-1900)
 Wilhelm Berg: Anteckningar om Göteborgs äldre teatrar / Band 2. 1794-1816 (1896-1900)

1759 births
1833 deaths
Swedish theatre directors
18th-century Swedish male actors
19th-century Swedish male actors
Swedish male stage actors
18th-century theatre managers
19th-century theatre managers